"At the End" is the second single by New York house music band iiO. It was released on November 4, 2002, and reached the top 20 in Denmark, Finland, Portugal, and the United Kingdom.

Charts

Release history

At the End (Metropolitan Mix)

Track listing

References

External links
 Official Music Video at YouTube
 At The End at Discogs

2002 singles
2002 songs
IiO songs
Ministry of Sound singles
Songs written by Nadia Ali (singer)